Many Wars Ago is a 1970 anti-war film set on the Alpine Front of the First World War. Directed, produced, and co-written by Francesco Rosi, the film is based on Emilio Lussu's memoir Un anno sull'altipiano ("One year on the plateau"), recounting his experiences at the Battle of Asiago. The Italian-Yugoslavian co-production was filmed in Belgrade and Zagreb, and stars Mark Frechette, Gian Maria Volonté, and Alain Cuny. It premiered at the 31st Venice International Film Festival.

Plot 
The film is set on the Alpine Front of World War I, between 1916 and 1917.

The conflict has turned into a bloody stalemate. Bogged down in their trenches on a barren highland, the men of an Italian infantry division have been given one objective: retake a commanding height from the Austro-Hungarian forces. Unfortunately, the tactical ingenuity of General Leone, the unpopular division commander, consists of supplementing frontal attacks against machine guns with medieval fighting schemes. His dispirited troops must be prodded with ever-harsher measures into storming the Austrian positions.

As casualties mount, indignation spreads among the rank and file. In one attack, a beloved junior officer is killed during an attempted mutiny, and subsequently every tenth man of his battalion is chosen to be executed by a firing squad of his comrades, in some bizarre kind of compensation for the killed officer. Disturbed by his superiors' decisions, the young Lieutenant Sassu is progressively led to question the purpose of war and reconsider where his real duties lie.

Cast

Production 
Many Wars Ago was one of three films that American hippie-turned-actor Mark Frechette appeared in. He had been cast by Michelangelo Antonioni in the lead role of Zabriskie Point, who at the time was living in active member of Mel Lyman's commune. The film was a commercial failure, but brought 21-year old Frechette to Italian producers. Because he didn't speak Italian, he spoke his lines in English, and was redubbed by Giancarlo Giannini. He tithed his entire salary from the film to the commune, and died two years later after a failed armed robbery.

The film was also Daria Nicolodi's debut.

Filming 
Principal photography took place in and around Belgrade (in modern-day Serbia) and Zagreb (in modern-day Croatia). The production was based at Belgrade's Centralni Filmski Studio Kosutnjak.

Reception 

In a retrospective review, Dusty Somers wrote "Many Wars Ago is a film where the fury of war is viscerally felt in scene after scene of pulsing movement and blasting sound. Rosi doesn’t shy away from launching a series of kinetic assaults on the senses, his close-up framing emphasizing chaos over any distinguishable moving parts."

Rosi said of the reaction to the film:

I was denounced for insulting the army, but I was acquitted in the preliminary investigation. The film was boycotted, by the explicit admission of those who did it: it was removed from the cinemas where it passed with the excuse that threatening phone calls were arriving. It had the honor of being the subject of General [Giovanni] De Lorenzo's speeches, abundantly reproduced on Italian television, which at that time certainly had no qualms about advertising a film in this way.The film was screened at the 65th Berlin International Film Festival in honor of Francesco Rosi, who had died a few weeks before.

References

External links

1970 films
1970s war drama films
Italian war drama films
Yugoslav war drama films
1970s Italian-language films
Anti-war films about World War I
World War I films set on the Italian Front
Films directed by Francesco Rosi
Films set in Italy
1970 drama films
Films shot in Belgrade
Films shot in Croatia
Films about mutinies
1970s Italian films